Inguromorpha basalis, the black-lined carpenterworm moth, is a moth in the family Cossidae. It is found in North America, where it has been recorded from the south-eastern United States, from New Jersey south to Florida and west to Missouri and Arkansas.

The wingspan is 26–38 mm. Adults have been recorded from May to August.

References

Bibliography
Natural History Museum Lepidoptera generic names catalog

Hypoptinae